Schizothymia is a temperament related to schizophrenia in a way analogous to cyclothymia's relationship with bipolar disorder. Schizothymia was proposed by Ernst Kretschmer when examining body types of schizophrenic patients. Schizothymia is defined by reduced affect display, a high degree of introversion, limited social cognition, and withdrawing from social relations generally. Nevertheless, individuals with such personality traits may achieve relatively affable social relations and a measure of affectivity situationally. As a kind of temperament, schizothymic personality traits are thought to be innate rather than the result of socialization or a lack thereof (Nature versus Nurture).

See also 
 Psychoticism
 Schizoid personality disorder
 Schizotypal personality disorder
 Schizotypy

References

External links 

Schizophrenia
Psychosis